Present Arms may refer to:

 Present Arms (album) by UB40, 1981
 Present Arms in Dub, a remix version, 1981
 "Present Arms" (Dad's Army radio episode), 1974
 Present Arms (musical), a 1928 Broadway musical comedy
 Present arms (command), a military drill command